The Sensei (Japanese: 先生) is a supervillain appearing in American comic books published by DC Comics. The Sensei was created by writer-artist Neal Adams and first appeared in Strange Adventures #215 (December 1968). The character is a martial arts sensei and adversary of the superhero Batman, along with Deadman and several other heroes. Sensei is the maternal great-grandfather of Damian Wayne, the father of Ra's al Ghul, and also the paternal grandfather of Talia al Ghul.

The character appeared on the third season of Gotham and was played by Raymond J. Barry renamed the Temple Shaman.

Publication history
Sensei first appeared in Strange Adventures #215 (December 1968) and was created by Neal Adams.

Fictional character biography
Ra's al Ghul may have founded the League of Assassins, but he would leave much of its affairs in the hands of Professor Ebeneezer Darrk and his second in command: the Sensei, an aged martial arts master from Hong Kong. After earning Ra's enmity (for reasons unknown), Darrk died during a plot to kidnap Talia al Ghul which was foiled by Batman.

The Sensei was put in charge of the League afterwards; however, he would prove just as disloyal as his predecessor, and the Sensei would eventually struggle with Ra's al Ghul for the control of the organization. (DC Comics Detective Comics #485 (September 1979)) For a time, the Sensei was possessed by the spirit called Jonah, who in Sensei's body was responsible for the murder of Boston Brand, who became Deadman after his death. After a struggle with Deadman and Rama Kushna, Jonah was destroyed and the Sensei resumed control of his body. For a brief time, the Sensei assumed leadership of the League of Assassins.

By this stage, the Sensei was clearly insane (if he had not been before) with no goals other than to raise assassination to an art form. Among other crimes he used Bronze Tiger, the brainwashed partner of Richard Dragon, to carry out a number of assassinations. Most notably he used the Bronze Tiger to occupy Batman in battle, while other assassins killed Batman's friend Kathy Kane. (DC Comics Detective Comics #485 (September 1979))

He next attempted to kill a number of dignitaries by having the League plant explosives along a fault line, stating that using a force of nature to carry out an assassination would be his greatest work of art. Although Batman arrived in time to rescue the delegates, he was unable to stop the earthquake. With no time to pursue the Sensei himself, Batman was forced to allow Ra's al Ghul to go after the assassin. Sensei then engaged himself in a fight to the death with Ra's al Ghul, during which both of them were swallowed by the earthquake. Ra's lived thanks to his rejuvenating Lazarus Pit.

The Sensei also somehow survived, to reappear in the "Batman: The Resurrection of Ra's al Ghul" storyline, wherein he is revealed to be Ra's al Ghul's father, Damian Wayne's maternal great-grandfather, and Talia al Ghul's paternal grandfather. When Ra's and Batman seek the Fountain of Youth in the Valley of Nanda Parbat, Sensei confronts them both, stabbing Ra's' decaying body and then attacking Batman, arrogantly informing the Dark Knight that, while he can only maintain the necessary physical strength to vanquish Batman for two minutes at his age, he only needs one minute to break him. However, Batman is able to take him by surprise, hurling both of them into the Fountain. It destroys Sensei due to his impure spirit, but Batman is not only healed, but apparently slightly rejuvenated by his dip in the waters.

Powers and abilities
The Sensei is an expert martial artist. His longevity allowed him to learn dozens of martial arts over the centuries, able to beat Batman within minutes, although his age meant that he was unable to physically confront the Dark Knight for long enough to do so.

Other versions

Batman: Odyssey
 The Sensei appears in Batman: Odyssey. In this incarnation, he is one of Ra's al Ghul's sons.

Young Justice tie-in comics
 Sensei appears in the comic book tie-in to Young Justice. In issue 3, Sensei is instructed by the Light to eliminate former associates of Cadmus. He sends Hook and Black Spider to assassinate Farano Enterprise CEO Selena Gonzales. In issue 11, Sensei and Talia al Ghul oversaw the revival of Ra's al Ghul. The revival of Ra's al Ghul worked, but Clayface emerged from the pit as well calling out Talia's name as Sensei blamed Talia. In issue 12, Sensei chops Clayface's arm when he grabs Talia. When Ra's al Ghul appears, Sensei tells him that the creature is Matt Hagen. After Ra's al Ghul tells Clayface that he is still a member of the League of Shadows and commands him to sleep, he orders Sensei to ship Clayface to Gotham City so that he can bother Batman.

Batman: Gotham Adventures

 The Sensei appeared in the comic book Batman: Gotham Adventures (based on The New Batman Adventures). Unlike his counterpart in the mainstream DC Universe, this version of the Sensei was more directly responsible for the murder of Boston Brand, creating the ghostly hero Deadman. In the comics, the Hook killed Boston Brand as part of his attempt to join the League of Assassins (one of the rules of joining the League being to pull off a public assassination and escaping without anyone learning the assassin's identity) with Brand simply being the easier target between him and Dick Grayson, who was performing the stunt with him. The Sensei served the Ra's al Ghul of the animated series, training assassins for the immortal's use. After being tracked down to the League's headquarters in Tibet, the Sensei engaged both Batman and Batgirl in combat and was apparently defeating them when the battle was broken up by Ra's al Ghul and Talia al Ghul. Ra's required Batman for his plans and when Batman refused to leave without the Sensei, Ra's ordered the Sensei to go with Batman. Neither wishing to get in the way of Ra's plans nor to spend the rest of his days in prison, the Sensei chose a third option and quietly walked out one of the windows of his mountain hideaway, falling to his death.

In other media

Television
 The Sensei appears in the Young Justice episode "Infiltrator", voiced by Keone Young. Here, he appears as a high-ranking member of the League of Shadows and with this show taking place on Earth-16, Sensei is not Ra's al Ghul's father as stated by Greg Weisman. He had abducted Dr. Serling Roquette in order to have her create the "Fog" (a bunch of nanites designed to devour information for the League of Shadows to use) at a League of Shadows base on Infinity Island. After Red Arrow had rescued Serling Roquette, Sensei sends Cheshire, Hook, and Black Spider to Happy Harbor (since the three of them were in the vicinity of Happy Harbor at the time) in order to assassinate Serling Roquette when she creates the "Anti-Fog." When Black Spider and Hook get captured and Cheshire escapes, it is shown that Sensei is in league with the Light telling them that they lost the information to WayneTech. A discussion between Sensei and L-2 states that they have "someone on the inside" to help both of them. He later reappears in the third season of the show in he has left the League of Shadows alongside Ra's al Ghul and his daughter Talia.
 A variation of the Sensei appears in Season 3 of Gotham, portrayed by Raymond J. Barry. This version of the Sensei is an amalgam of the comic book version of the Sensei and the character the Shaman from the Batman: Legends of the Dark Knight story "Batman: Shaman". Credited under the alias of the Temple Shaman for most of the season, he works for Ra's al Ghul to oversee the Court of Owls' activities and to train Bruce into being on the path to his destiny. In the episode Pretty Hate Machine he is referred to as Sensei by Hugo Strange. He is eventually shot and killed by Alfred Pennyworth while attempting to make Bruce set off a virus bomb in Gotham. His last words to Bruce are to go to the Yuyan Building and seek out the Demon's Head.

Video games
 The Sensei appears in DC Universe Online'', voiced by Robert Dieke.

References

External links
 Sensei at DC Wikia

DC Comics martial artists
Fictional assassins in comics
Fictional ninja
Comics characters introduced in 1968
Characters created by Neal Adams
Fictional characters without a name